Trail of Tears was a series of forced relocations of Native American nations from their ancestral homelands in the Southeastern United States following the passage of the Indian Removal Act of 1830.

Trail of Tears may also refer to:

Places
 Trail of Tears State Forest in southern Illinois
 Trail of Tears State Park in Missouri

Art, entertainment, and media

Film
 The Trail of Tears: Cherokee Legacy, a 2006 documentary

Music

Artists
 Trail of Tears (band), a Norwegian musical group

Albums
 Trails of Tears (Jacques Coursil album), 2010
 Trail of Tears (Billy Ray Cyrus album), 1996
 Trail of Tears (The Renderers album), 1990

Songs
 "Trail of Tears", a song by Guadalcanal Diary, from their 1984 album, Walking in the Shadow of the Big Man
 "Trail of Tears", a song composed by Roger Cook, Allen Reynolds and Randy Handley and recorded by John Denver, on his 1985 album, Dreamland Express and by Hal Ketchum on his 1992 album  Sure Love
 "Trail of Tears", a song by British pop star Midge Ure, released on his 1996 solo album Breathe
 "Trial of Tears", a song by Dream Theater, from their 1997 album, Falling into Infinity
 "Trail of Tears", a song by Eric Johnson, from his 1986 album, Tones
 "Trail of Tears", a song by Nuclear Assault, from their 1989 album, Handle with Care
 "Trail of Tears", a song by Testament, from their 1994 album, Low

Television
 "Trail of Tears" (Strangers with Candy), a Season 3 episode of the television comedy Strangers with Candy

See also 
 
 Highway of Tears murders